CHEC may refer to:

 Cape Hatteras Electric Cooperative
 Cape Higher Education Consortium
 China Harbour Engineering
 CHLB-FM, a radio station in Lethbridge, Alberta, previously known as CHEC